Duverger (also spelt du Vergier, DuVerger and Duvergé) is a French surname, originally a patronymic, meaning Du Verger (English: of the Garden or From Eden). The Duverger family nobility could be traced back to the thirteenth century during which they served as part of the French royal army under the House of Bourbon a title they would hold even after the French Revolution.

Notable individuals with the surname Duverger include:
 Antonio Duvergé (1807–1855) was a Dominican general of French origin who served in the Dominican War of Independence.
 François Véron Duverger de Forbonnais (1722–1800), French political economist
 Jean Duverger (born 1973), Mexican actor and entertainer of French-Haitian ancestry
 Maurice Duverger (1917–2014), French jurist, sociologist, political scientist and politician
 René Duverger (1911–1983), French Olympic weightlifter
 Théophile Emmanuel Duverger (1821–1901?), French painter
 Henri de la Rochejaquelein "Henri du Vergier" (1772–1794), was a general of the Royalist Vendéan insurrection during the French Revolution.

See also

 De la Rochejacquelein, a Vendéan French noble family originally named Duverger

French-language surnames

 Noble
French noble families
French nobility